Exarcheia square is located in the Exarcheia neighborhood of Athens and it is considered the center of the neighborhood. The square is a gathering place for people of all ages, but especially young people, and many activities organized by anti-authoritarian or anarchist groups take place there.

The center of the square was decorated until September 2022 by a sculpture called "Τρεις Έρωτες" ("Three Loves"), dated back to 1909. The sculpture was removed due to the works for the construction of a metro station for the Line 4 of the Athens metro. The construction of the aforementioned station has sparked controversies and a series of protests against it, on grounds of destroying part of the area's few green spaces and contributing to the gentrification of a historically politically active neighborhood.

References 

Squares in Athens